Family Perfume is a double album by Tim Presley under the name White Fence. The first album, Family Perfume, Vol. 1 was released on April 3, 2012 and its followup, Family Perfume, Vol. 2, was released a month later on May 15, 2012. Each album was limited to a run of 1,000 copies.

Track listing

Family Perfume, Vol. 1

Family Perfume, Vol. 2

Reception
Critical reception has been mixed to positive. Volume 1 currently holds a rating of 72 (based upon 8 reviews) on Metacritic and Volume 2's rating is 77 (based on 5 reviews). Pitchfork Media gave an overall favorable review for both volumes, but remarked that the first volume was "the most consistent of the pair". CMJ.com also gave a mixed review, commenting that "The unpredictable mix incites some strange transitions, occasionally cutting off promising grooves to the album’s detriment (“Groundskeeper Rag,” especially, peaks prematurely). But what Family Perfume lacks in momentum it makes up for in brevity, never lingering on one motif for more than two or three minutes before skipping enthusiastically into the next like an overeager basement party DJ."

References

2012 albums
Tim Presley albums
Woodsist albums